Jovan "Kule" Aćimović (born 21 June 1948) is a former Serbian football player.

His son Đorđe was also a footballer who played for Red Star Belgrade and FK Mačva Šabac.

International career
On the national level he played for Yugoslavia national team (55 matches/three goals), and was a participant at the 1974 FIFA World Cup, and at UEFA Euro 1968 and UEFA Euro 1976.

Aćimović on his team's role at the UEFA Euro 1976:

References

External links 
 Career story at Reprezentacija.rs 
 

1948 births
Living people
Footballers from Belgrade
Yugoslav footballers
Serbian footballers
Serbian expatriate footballers
1974 FIFA World Cup players
Bundesliga players
1. FC Saarbrücken players
Expatriate footballers in West Germany
Association football midfielders
OFK Beograd players
Yugoslav expatriate footballers
Yugoslavia international footballers
Yugoslav First League players
Red Star Belgrade footballers
Red Star Belgrade non-playing staff
UEFA Euro 1968 players
UEFA Euro 1976 players
Yugoslav expatriate sportspeople in West Germany
FK Sinđelić Beograd players